The 2009 Liga Super also known as the TM Liga Super for sponsorship reasons is the sixth season of the Liga Super, the top-tier professional football league in Malaysia.

The season was held from 3 January and concluded on 3 August 2009.

The Liga Super champions for 2009 was Selangor.

Teams
A total of 14 teams compete in the 2009 season which includes the top 12 teams that participated in the 2007–08 season and champions and runners-up of the 2007-08 Liga Premier.

Sarawak were relegated at the end of the 2009 Liga Super season after finishing in the bottom place of the league table.

DPMM was excluded from the competition as per FIFA rules after Football Association of Brunei Darussalam was deregistered by the Registrar of Societies.

2007-08 Liga Premier champions Kuala Muda Naza and runners-up PLUS secured direct promotion to the Liga Super.

 Kedah (2007–08 Liga Super winner)
 Kelantan
 Negeri Sembilan
 Johor FC
 Selangor
 Perak
 Terengganu
 Perlis
 Pahang
 PDRM
 UPB-MyTeam
 Penang
 Kuala Muda Naza
 PLUS

Notes

League table

Results

Season statistics

Top scorers

See also
 List of Liga Super seasons

References

Malaysia Super League seasons
1
Malaysia
Malaysia